Beast was a restaurant in Portland, Oregon. The business earned chef and owner Naomi Pomeroy a James Beard Foundation Award for Best Chef: Northwest in 2014.

Description 
The restaurant served French and Pacific Northwest cuisine in a 600-square-foot dining room with two tables for communal dining. The restaurant served prix fixe dinners as well as brunch.

History 
Pomeroy opened Beast in 2007 with business partner Micah Camden and sous chef Mika Paredes. Pomeroy was negotiating a lease to relocate the business as of 2012.

The restaurant closed in March 2020, during the COVID-19 pandemic. The space was converted into a market called Ripe Cooperative.

Reception 
Beast and Le Pigeon were named co-2008 Restaurants of the Year by The Oregonian. Beast won in the Best Prix Fixe Menu category of Willamette Week's annual Best of Portland readers' poll in 2016.

See also
 Impact of the COVID-19 pandemic on the restaurant industry in the United States
 James Beard Foundation Award: 2010s
 List of defunct restaurants of the United States
 List of French restaurants
 List of Pacific Northwest restaurants

References

External links

 Beast at Condé Nast Traveler
 Beast at Frommer's
 Beast at Portland Monthly
 Beast at Thrillist
 Beast at Travel + Leisure
 Beast at Zomato

2007 establishments in Oregon
2020 disestablishments in Oregon
Concordia, Portland, Oregon
Defunct French restaurants in Portland, Oregon
Defunct Pacific Northwest restaurants
Pacific Northwest restaurants in Oregon
Restaurants disestablished during the COVID-19 pandemic
Restaurants disestablished in 2020
Restaurants established in 2007